Matter-Eater Lad (Tenzil Kem) is a superhero in the DC Universe. He is a member of the Legion of Super-Heroes and possesses the power to eat matter in all forms, as do all natives of his home planet, Bismoll. He first appears in Adventure Comics #303 (December 1962).

Publication history
Matter-Eater Lad first appeared in Adventure Comics #303 and was created by Jerry Siegel and John Forte.

Fictional character biography

Pre–Zero Hour
Matter-Eater Lad is the fifteenth member inducted into the Legion of Super-Heroes, joining soon after Bouncing Boy. In his first appearance, Matter-Eater Lad explains his origins, saying that the natives of Bismoll found that microbes had made all their food inedible, and that the populace evolved their ability to eat all matter as a survival mechanism. This gives his teeth and jaws, apparently, the strength and durability to bite and chew through stone, metal, and other hard substances the way that Superboy Mon-el can. Tenzil's mother is named Mitz Kem, and his father Rall (who, curiously, use Tenzil's LSH stipend to buy groceries as told in "The Hapless Hero" in Action Comics #381, despite ostensibly being Bismollians). His brother, Renkil, tries to take Tenzil's place in the Legion during one story (Superboy #184). Their family life is shown to be rough. He has an unrequited crush on Shrinking Violet, which features for the bulk of the Legion's run in Adventure Comics.

He appears rarely in Legion stories, as the writers struggled with the problem of how to make his power useful in a fight and was routinely written out via a plot device where Tenzil was constantly being drafted into his planet's political system due to his fame as a Legion member. During one of his first draftings to be in politics, he put in a good word for fellow Bismollian, Calorie Queen, who had somewhat similar powers as him, but also had the ability to turn caloric energy into super strength. Matter-Eater Lad has one major heroic moment, though, when he saves the universe by eating the previously thought to be indestructible Miracle Machine, though the energies of the device leave him insane for several years. He is ultimately cured by Brainiac 5. He would later avert the conquest of Bismoll by an army of Computo replicas, with the assistance of the Legion Subs (this mission would cause Polar Boy to disband his group, and join the Legion proper).

In volume 4 of Legion of the Super-Heroes Matter-Eater Lad plays a significant role. Keith Giffen, who had much success with humor in his 1987 Justice League relaunch, revamped Tenzil Kem (which could arguably be explained as consequence of his regained sanity) as a free spirit who rebels against his planet's virtual enslavement of him as a senator by becoming a multimedia celebrity, using his planet's tax money to finance multiple television shows that allow Tenzil to leave his planet for trips to Earth and other planets for adventure and fun. While Tenzil's exploits generate disdain from his world's rulers, his adventures make him even more popular with the masses of his homeworld, resulting in Tenzil being kept on as senator. "Trust me, I'm a senator" is an oft-uttered catchphrase during this period. Tenzil eventually comes into conflict with former Legion villain Prince Evillo, founder of The Devil's Dozen, and is sent to a Hades-like dimension. Upon his return, he discovers that, having been technically dead, he has been voted out of office by the opposition party (who dislike both his disrespect for their traditions and his overwhelming popularity), so he leaves Bismoll for adventure.

During the "Five Year Gap" following the Magic Wars, Earth fell under the covert control of the Dominators, and withdrew from the United Planets. When fellow Legionnaire Polar Boy was unjustly imprisoned by Earthgov for speaking out against the Dominators, Tenzil traveled to Earth, and used his force of will and absurdist sense of humor to free him. Tenzil rejoined the Legion, and since the team was operating without the assistance of the United Planets, his political connections and owed favors became very important to the Legion. Matter-Eater Lad ultimately seduced and married former Legion villain Saturn Queen.

Soon thereafter, the members of the Dominators' highly classified "Batch SW6" escaped captivity. Originally, Batch SW6 appeared to be a group of teenage Legionnaire clones, created from samples apparently taken just prior to Ferro Lad's death at the hands of the Sun-Eater. Later, they were revealed to be time-paradox duplicates every bit as legitimate as their older counterparts. After Earth was destroyed in a disaster reminiscent of the destruction of Krypton over a millennium earlier, a few dozen surviving cities and their inhabitants reconstituted their world as New Earth. The SW6 Legionnaires—including their version of Matter-Eater Lad—remained.

Post–Zero Hour
After the events of the Zero Hour miniseries, Legion continuity was completely rebooted. Tenzil Kem (along with Bouncing Boy) are recast as part of the Legion's civilian support staff. Tenzil serves as the team's personal chef. Unlike the post-Zero Hour Bouncing Boy (who ultimately does join the team, as the group's pilot) Tenzil never joins the team, though he does help the team out during several battles when the group's base is attacked. Unlike his pre-Zero Hour counterpart, Tenzil's spit is similar to acid.

"Threeboot"
Tenzil Kem was reintroduced in the current run of the Legion as a government agent, investigating Cosmic Boy's disappearance and the legality of his final act as Legion leader. He seems to possess the powers of his previous incarnations, escaping a deathtrap by devouring an entire silo full of grain. He also bites off the pointer finger of Mekt Ranzz.

Post-Infinite Crisis
The events of the Infinite Crisis miniseries have apparently restored a close analogue of the Pre-Crisis Legion to continuity, as seen in "The Lightning Saga" story arc in Justice League of America and Justice Society of America, and in the "Superman and the Legion of Super-Heroes" story arc in Action Comics. Matter-Eater Lad is included in their number but is MIA. In Final Crisis: Legion of 3 Worlds #5, the SW6 version of Matter-Eater Lad was among the many Legionnaires pulled from the Multiverse to fight the Time Trapper.

In Superman #694, Matter-Eater Lad is revealed to have been masquerading as Mon-El's friend Mitch, owner of a local cafe. He reveals his identity by stepping in to save a woman trapped in a burning car, allowing Mon-El to continue fighting the larger threats.

As revealed in Adventure Comics (vol. 2) #8, Matter-Eater Lad is part of a secret team sent by the late R. J. Brande to the 21st century to save the future in the Last Stand of New Krypton storyline.

In other media
 Tenzil Kem / Matter-Eater Lad appears in Legion of Super Heroes, voiced by Alexander Polinsky. Introduced as a civilian in the episode "Champions", he participates in the Intergalactic Games before helping the Legion defeat the Fatal Five when the latter group attack the games. In the episode "The Substitutes", Kem auditions to join the Legion as Matter-Eater Lad and gains membership. In the episode "The Man from the Edge of Tomorrow", he destroys the Emerald Eye of Ekron, successfully de-powering the Emerald Empress, but puts himself into a coma. Over the course of the episodes "In the Beginning" and "Dark Victory", he recovers and eventually returns to active duty.
 Matter-Eater Lad received an action figure in Mattel's DC Universe Classics line as part of the Legion of Super-Heroes 12-pack.
 Matter-Eater Lad is referenced in Guided By Voices' EP Clown Prince of the Menthol Trailer.

References

External links
 A Hero History Of Matter-Eater Lad

Characters created by Jerry Siegel
Comics characters introduced in 1963
DC Comics aliens
DC Comics characters with superhuman strength
DC Comics extraterrestrial superheroes
DC Comics superheroes
Fictional senators